RAF St Jean was a former military airfield in Palestine, now Israel, which is located  approximately 4 km east-northeast of Acre and 100 km north-northeast of Tel Aviv.

When located in the British Mandate of Palestine during World War II the airfield was used as a military airfield by the Royal Air Force and the United States Army Air Forces of America during the North African Campaign against Axis forces.

USAAF Ninth Air Force units which used the airfield were:

 343rd Bombardment Squadron (98th Bombardment Group), 21 August-10 November 1942, B-24 Liberator
 344th Bombardment Squadron (98th Bombardment Group), 21 August-11 November 1942, B-24 Liberator

After the war, the airfield appears to have been abandoned.  The area today is a collection of agricultural fields.  Two single-lane agricultural roads in a "V" pattern are the remnants of the airfield's runways (17/35, 10/28), but no evidence of the support area or runways remain.

References

 Maurer, Maurer. Air Force Combat Units of World War II. Maxwell AFB, Alabama: Office of Air Force History, 1983. .
 

Royal Air Force stations in the Middle East
Airfields of the United States Army Air Forces
Airports in Israel
World War II sites in Israel
World War II sites in Mandatory Palestine